Robert Allison Fetzer Hall is a multi-purpose sport venue on the campus of University of North Carolina at Chapel Hill in Chapel Hill, North Carolina, United States. The building hosts several sport courts. The Fetzer Gyms A and B are used for basketball, volleyball, badminton and team handball.

References

External links
Fetzer Hall

Handball venues in the United States
North Carolina Tar Heels team handball
Indoor arenas in North Carolina
North Carolina Tar Heels sports venues